Dušan Pavlović (born 24 September 1977) is a Swiss former football midfielder. He played a number of seasons in the Swiss Super League, appearing in over 100 games.

External links

1977 births
Living people
Swiss men's footballers
Swiss people of Serbian descent
Swiss Super League players
2. Bundesliga players
Grasshopper Club Zürich players
FC Lugano players
FC Baden players
AC Bellinzona players
FC Wil players
FC St. Gallen players
FC Erzgebirge Aue players
Expatriate footballers in Germany
Hapoel Ra'anana A.F.C. players
Swiss expatriate footballers
Expatriate footballers in Israel
Association football midfielders